Pierre-Henry Azagoh (born 25 July 1998) is a French rugby union player, who plays for Stade Français.

Biography 
Pierre-Henry Azagoh was called by Fabien Galthié to the French national team for the first time in June 2021, for the Australia summer tour.

References

External link

1998 births
Living people
French rugby union players
Stade Français players
Sportspeople from Nîmes
Rugby union locks